The bass trombone is the bass instrument in the trombone family of brass instruments. Modern instruments are pitched in the same B♭ as the tenor trombone but with a larger bore, bell and mouthpiece to facilitate low register playing, and usually two valves to fill in the missing range immediately above the pedal tones.

History 

The earliest bass trombones were the bass sackbuts, usually pitched in G, F, or E♭ below the B♭ tenor. They had a smaller bore and less flared bell than modern instruments, and a longer slide with an attached handle to allow slide positions otherwise beyond the reach of a fully outstretched arm. The earliest known surviving specimen is an instrument in G built in Germany in 1593. This instrument matches descriptions and illustrations by Praetorius from his 1614–20 Syntagma Musicum. The  in B♭ refers to a very large and unwieldy predecessor of the contrabass trombone, a full octave below the tenor.

Bass sackbuts were used in Europe during the Renaissance and early Baroque periods. By the 18th century the F and E♭ bass trombones were used in Germany, Austria and Sweden, and the E♭ bass trombone in France.

The "tenor-bass" trombone 

It facilitated playing bass trombone parts in the low register, but was missing notes below E. Treatise author Georges Kastner and other contemporary writers described a dissatisfaction with bass instruments in F or E♭, due to their slow and unwieldy slides. The invention of valves was quickly applied to create valve trombones in the 1830s which replaced the slide altogether; these became popular in military bands and Italian opera.

These instruments in B♭/F gradually replaced the larger bass trombones in F and E♭ over the course of the 19th and early 20th centuries. Late Romantic German composers specifying Tenorbaßposaune in scores intended a B♭/F trombone capable of playing below E; Arnold Schoenberg called for four in Gurre-Lieder (1911).

The bass trombone in Britain 

From about the mid-nineteenth century, the bass trombone in G enjoyed a period of extended popularity in France and especially Britain. In brass bands in Britain, the G bass trombone was standard, built largely by makers Besson and Boosey & Hawkes with no valves and a slide handle for reaching the longer sixth and seventh positions. For use in British orchestras from the early twentieth century, it was often built with a D or C valve attachment. The G bass trombone was in use until the 1950s, when London orchestral players began importing larger bore American B♭ instruments, particularly by Conn. The G trombone lingered on in some parts of Britain and former British colonies well into the 1980s, particularly in brass bands and period instrument orchestras.

Recent developments 

The modern bass trombone has evolved from the large-bore B♭/F tenor-bass trombones in the late 19th century. In the early 20th century, manufacturers attempted to solve the problem of the missing low B♮ on such instruments by adding a second valve. In the 1920s, manufacturers Conn and Holton made B♭/F bass trombones with a  that could lower the F tubing to E when manually set. The first true double-valve trombone (where the second valve can be operated while playing) was made by Olds in 1937, using a second dependent valve to lower the F attachment a semitone to E.

In the 1950s, several bass trombonists in North American orchestras had double-valve instruments custom-built, and these designs were eventually adopted by manufacturers. In 1956, Vincent Bach modified their 50B bass trombone to add a second dependent E valve similar to the Olds model, initially for Lawrence Weinman, then bass trombonist with Minneapolis Symphony. Bach first released their 50B2 model, based on this design, in 1961. In the late 1960s custom instruments appeared using a second independent valve, lowering the instrument to G and to E♭ when engaged with the first valve. The first commercially available trombone using independent valves was the Olds S-24G model in 1973. Although new to the bass trombone, this idea was anticipated in Germany in the 1920s by Ernst Dehmel's design for a contrabass trombone in F with two independent valves.

The early 1980s saw the emergence of the axial flow valve, known as the "Thayer" valve after its inventor, praised by trombonists due to its free-blowing, more open-feeling playing characteristics and sound. It was gradually adopted on high-end trombone models from US manufacturers by the 1990s, particularly from Edwards, Shires and Bach. This sparked further innovation in free-blowing valves; Conn patented its own CL2000 valve developed with Christian Lindberg, and the Swiss Hagmann valve was adopted by European manufacturers.

Construction 

The modern bass trombone uses the same  length of tubing as the tenor trombone, but with a wider bore, a larger bell, and a larger mouthpiece which facilitate playing in the low register.

Dependent and independent valves 

The bass trombone has typically two valves that lower the pitch of the instrument when engaged, to facilitate the register between the B♭1 pedal in first position and the E2 second partial in seventh. The first valve lowers the key of the instrument a fourth to F. The second (when engaged with the first) will lower the instrument to D (or less commonly, E♭).

The second valve can be configured in one of two ways, referred to as either "dependent" or "independent" (sometimes also called "in-line"). In a dependent system, the second valve is fitted to the tubing of the first valve, and can only be engaged in combination with the first. In an independent system, the second valve is fitted to the main tubing next to the first valve, and can be used independently. The second independent valve typically lowers the instrument to G♭, and D when engaged in tandem with the first valve. Less commonly the second valve is tuned to G (combining to give E♭), or has a tuning slide that can tune the valve to either G or G♭ as desired.

Single-valve instruments 

The low B1 note immediately above the pedal range is unobtainable on a standard trombone slide with a single valve in F. Bass trombones from the 19th and early 20th century were sometimes made with a valve attachment in E rather than F, or with an alternative tuning slide to lower the pitch to E♭. Today, single-valve bass trombones have a tuning slide on the valve section that is long enough to enable access to the low B1 by lowering the pitch from F to E.

Range 

The range of the modern bass trombone with two valves is fully chromatic from the lowest pedal B♭ with both valves engaged (or even A with valve slides extended), up to at least B♭. Although much of the established orchestral repertoire infrequently strays below B♭ or above G, and is typically written in the lower registers, there are some exceptions. French composers in the 19th century and early 20th century wrote third trombone parts for tenor trombone, writing as high as A (Bizet L'Arlésienne, Franck Symphony in D minor), and omitting notes below E except for occasional pedal notes (Berlioz used pedal B♭ and A in Symphonie fantastique (1830), and wrote to pedal G♯ in his Grande Messe des morts ). English composers in the same period were writing for a bass trombone in G, and avoided writing below D♭, even though instruments were made with a valve attachment in D by around 1900.

The 20th century saw further extensions of the bass trombone range, such as the fortissimo pedal D in Berg's Drei Orchesterstücke (1915), and the high B in Kodály's 1927 Háry János suite. Contemporary orchestral and solo classical pieces, as well as modern jazz arrangements, often further exploit the wide tonal range of the bass trombone.

Repertoire 
Since the Romantic period, the trombone section of an orchestra, wind ensemble, or British-style brass band usually consists of two tenor trombones and at least one bass trombone. In a modern jazz big band, at least one of the trombonists will play bass trombone, often serving as the anchor of the trombone section or doubling the double bass and baritone saxophone.

George Roberts (affectionately known as "Mr. Bass Trombone") was one of the first players to champion the solo possibilities of the instrument. One of the first major classical solo works for the instrument was the Concerto for Bass Trombone by Thom Ritter George.

Images

References

Bibliography 

 
 
 
 
 
 

Bass (sound)
Orchestral instruments
Trombones